The 1998–99 Mighty Ducks of Anaheim season was the sixth season in franchise history.

Off-season
The roster was shaken up a lot during the previous season and only a few changes took place in the summer. The Ducks traded Dave Karpa and a 2000 4th round pick to the Carolina Hurricanes for Kevin Haller and Stu Grimson on June 18. Two months later they acquired Jim Mckenzie for Jean-Francois Jomphe on August 11. They signed veteran Fredrik Olausson, who was with the Ducks before, to give the team scoring from the blue line, and Pascal Trepanier. Rookies Antti Aalto and Johan Davidsson made the roster while Mike Crowley who played very well last season would see more ice time with the parent team.

For the first time since the Ducks traded Ron Tugnutt to the Montreal Canadiens in 1994 the team saw just their second change in net, losing Mikhail Shtalenkov to the Nashville Predators in the 1998 NHL Expansion Draft. That left them with Prospects Patrick Lalime and Chris Mason for the back up position. 
Just before the season started the Ducks acquired Dominic Roussel from the Nashville Predators for Chris Mason and Marc Moro on October 5, 1998 which gave the team more experience in case Hebert would be sidelined like last season. Days later they sent Doug Houda to Detroit on October 9.

Regular season
The season was much more consistent than last season. Anaheim started off slow, losing their first three games and scoring only one goal but was unbeaten the next six games. On October 27, 1998 they added Marty McInnes, a key player who gave them more scoring depth for the team's upcoming success and dominating Powerplay. On November 8 Tomas Sandstrom suffered a broken left wrist which kept him sidelined until late December thus relying more on their star players and hoping for others to fill the void. The team managed to comeback a few times after going winless some games and even put up an unbeaten streak like in early December (4-0-2) and a winning streak in early February (4-0-0). January turned out to be the very tough going 4-9-1 and winless (0-5-1) a second time since late November. Overall the Ducks were hovering around the .500 mark fighting to go to the post season.

In February the team pushed themselves into the Play Off as the Mighty Ducks went 13-3-1 from February 3 until March 10 including a team record seven game winning streak. Anaheim stayed consistent after their, streak going 4-4-3, but registering a record of 1-5-1 in their last seven games, thus missing out on 5th place facing rather Phoenix than the Red Wings as they finished the season 6th in the west since the team was unable to maintain their amazing run in April.
The Blues only lost 1 game in their last nine games where as the Ducks only won one game out of their last seven, ironically against the Phoenix Coyotes,

During that 7 game-winning-streak the team only allowed 1 goal in each of those games, highlighting the great goaltending of Guy Hebert, who had a career year and his best season since 1996–97. Dominic Roussel also enjoyed a stellar comeback in the NHL as the team's backup. Both goalies provided excellent goaltending for the Mighty Ducks, each posting a save percentage above .920 as well as a superb GAA. Those great numbers were supported by their Defense as the team allowed 55 goals less than last year. Offensively the Ducks only scored 10 goals more than last season and relied very heavily on their first line ( Kariya - Rucchin - Selanne ) combining for 109 goals. Additional scoring was only provided by Marty McInnes (17 goals), defenceman Fredrik Olausson (16 goals) and Tomas Sandstrom (15 goals), who improved over last season but missed 24 games due to injury. Matt Cullen enjoyed a good second season, tallying 11 goals which was almost double than last year while Travis Green only scored 13 goals and 30 points which was below expectation. Rookies Anti Aaalto and Johan Davidson did not make an impact in the scoring department.

The Mighty Ducks finished the regular season with the most power-play goals, 83, and the best power-play percentage, 21.96% (83 for 378) in the NHL.

Final standings

Schedule and results

Playoffs
The Mighty Ducks met the Detroit Red Wings in the first round of the playoffs. The Wings swept the Mighty Ducks in four games.

Late in Game 3 Stu Grimson cross-checked Kris Draper in the face in front of the Red Wings which caused a brawl between both teams.

Game 1: Mighty Ducks 3, Detroit 5

Game 2: Mighty Ducks 1, Detroit 5

Game 3: Detroit 4, Mighty Ducks 2

Game 4: Detroit 3, Mighty Ducks 0

Detroit Wins Series 4-0

Player statistics

Regular season
Scoring

Goaltending

Playoffs
Scoring

Goaltending

Awards and records

Transactions

Acquired Marty McInnes from the Chicago Blackhawks ( previously acquired from the Calgary Flames ) for a 4th round draft pick on October 27, 1998

Traded Drew Bannister to the Tampa Bay Lightning for a 2000 5th round pick on December 10, 1998

Traded Josef Marha to the Chicago Blackhawks for future considerations (became a 1999 4th round draft) on January 28, 1999

Draft picks
Anaheim's draft picks at the 1998 NHL Entry Draft held at the Marine Midland Arena in Buffalo, New York.

Farm teams
Cincinnati Mighty Ducks

See also
1998–99 NHL season

References
Bibliography
 

Anaheim Ducks seasons
A
A
Mighty Ducks of Anaheim
Mighty Ducks of Anaheim